Beatriz García (born 23 April 1970) is a Spanish former international football midfielder who played for Añorga.

Biography

Beatriz García  started playing football at a 13 years old and began playing for Añorga a year later in the  1984-1985 season. She played contiued playing for Añorga until the 1996–97 season. Where García transferred to FC Barcelona. She finally ended her career at CF Llers before retiring at 32. Overall Beatriz García won 3 División de Honor titles and 3 Copa de la Reina titles.

International career
García was part of the Spanish team at the 1997 European Championships that reached the semi finals.

Honours

Club
Añorga

División de Honor (3)
 1992, 1995, 1996
Copa de la Reina
 1990, 1991, 1993

References

1970 births
Living people
Footballers from the Basque Country (autonomous community)
Spain women's international footballers
Primera División (women) players
Women's association football midfielders
Spanish women's footballers
Añorga KKE players
FC Barcelona Femení players